Abu Suweir Air Base is an Egyptian Air Force base, located approximately  west of Ismaïlia and  northeast of Cairo.  It is positioned for strategic defence of the Suez Canal waterway.

Second World War and Suez Crisis 
During the Second World War the airfield, then known as RAF Abu Sueir or Abu Sueir Airfield (LG-205) was used as a military airfield by the Royal Air Force of the United Kingdom and the American United States Army Air Forces during the North African Campaign against Axis forces.

USAAF Ninth Air Force units which used the airfield were:

 376th Bombardment Group, 8 November 1942-January 1943, Consolidated B-24 Liberator
 512th Bombardment Squadron, 9 November 1942-10 February 1943
 513th Bombardment Squadron, 8 November 1942-10 February 1943
 514th Bombardment Squadron, 8 November 1942-10 February 1943
 515th Bombardment Squadron, 8 November 1942-6 February 1943

In the mid-1950s, the base was the last station to be handed over by the RAF to the Egyptians. This was despite the fact that Abu Sueir and Fanara were the two bases to be retained, to be maintained by civilian contractors. 

The main body of 2nd Battalion Grenadier Guards, the last British Army fighting unit remaining in Middle East Land Forces amid the Suez Crisis, left on 24-25 March 1956 by ship; they had been located at Golf Course Camp in Port Said. The last remaining rear-guard company of the battalion left by air on 2 April 1956 from Abu Sueir. 

Abu Sueir was handed over to Egypt on 14 April 1956.

Twenty-first century 
Today, the airfield is an active Egyptian Air Force Base. Its Second World War configuration is still evident in aerial photography. It houses the 60th Tactical Fighter Squadron of the 262nd Tactical Fighter Wing, flying General Dynamics F-16C/D Block 40s Fighting Falcons.

See also
 List of North African airfields during World War II

References

 Royal Air Force Airfield Creation for the Western Desert Campaign

World War II airfields in Egypt
Egyptian Air Force bases